The Duntze Baronetcy, of Tiverton in the County of Devon, is a dormant title in the Baronetage of Great Britain. It was created on 8 November 1774 for John Duntze, an Exeter wool merchant and Member of Parliament for Tiverton. The family was of German descent. The presumed seventh Baronet never successfully established his claim to the title. Likewise, as of 13 June 2007 the presumed eighth and present Baronet has also not successfully proven his succession and is therefore not on the Official Roll of the Baronetage, with the baronetcy considered dormant since 1985.

John Alexander Duntze, grandson of the first Baronet and great-grandfather of the presumed eighth Baronet, was an Admiral in the Royal Navy.

Duntze baronets, of Tiverton (1774)
Sir John Duntze, 1st Baronet (–1795)
Sir John Duntze, 2nd Baronet (c. 1765–1830)
Sir John Lewis Duntze, 3rd Baronet (1809–1884)
Sir George Alexander Duntze, 4th Baronet (1839–1922)
Sir George Puxley Duntze, 5th Baronet (1873–1947)
Sir George Edwin Douglas Duntze, 6th Baronet (1913–1985)
John Alexander Duntze, presumed 7th Baronet (1909–1987)
Daniel Evans Duntze, presumed 8th Baronet (1926–1997)
Daniel Evans Duntze, presumed 9th Baronet (born 1960)

References
Kidd, Charles, Williamson, David (editors). Debrett's Peerage and Baronetage (1990 edition). New York: St Martin's Press, 1990.

Duntze
Duntze
1774 establishments in Great Britain